The 2003 Nigerian Senate election in Cross River State was held on April 12, 2003, to elect members of the Nigerian Senate to represent Cross River State. Gregory Ngaji representing Cross River North, Victor Ndoma-Egba representing Cross River Central and Bassey Ewa-Henshaw representing Cross River South all won on the platform of the Peoples Democratic Party.

Overview

Summary

Results

Cross River North 
The election was won by Gregory Ngaji of the Peoples Democratic Party.

Cross River Central 
The election was won by Victor Ndoma-Egba of the Peoples Democratic Party.

Cross River South 
The election was won by Bassey Ewa-Henshaw of the Peoples Democratic Party.

References 

April 2003 events in Nigeria
Cross River State Senate elections
Cros